The 1921 Mississippi College Choctaws football team represented Mississippi College as a member of the Southern Intercollegiate Athletic Association (SIAA) during the 1921 college football season. The team was led by second-year head coach Stanley L. Robinson and College Football Hall of Famer, halfback Goat Hale. "Ten other players are on Hale's teams, but they are there merely to conform with gridiron rules." Hale scored 161 points and gained 2,160 yards as he was selected All-Southern. The team's stadium is today named Robinson-Hale stadium, for coach Robinson and Goat Hale.

Schedule

Schedule sources:

Season summary

Tulane

Goat Hale nearly single-handedly defeated Tulane 14–0. Hale scored first on a 25-yard run around right end, and the second touchdown came on a run of 80 yards. Soon after, he signed a large baseball contract.

Louisiana College 
In the second week of play the Choctaws beat Louisiana College 68–0.

Mississippi A&M 
The season's only SIAA loss came in the third week against in-state rival Mississippi A&M by a single point, 14–13.

Union 
The Union Bulldogs were defeated 35–0.

Birmingham–Southern

Hale scored three touchdowns in a 27–6 victory over Birmingham–Southern. The first was a 60-yard punt return. The Panthers scored in the third quarter on a 55-yard touchdown pass from Gandy to Griffin.

The starting lineup was Simmons (left end), Hudson (left tackle), Everett (left guard), Sheffield (center), Fortenberry (right guard), Stuart (right tackle), Austin (right end), Lambright (quarterback), Hale (left halfback), Tyler (right halfback), Keith (fullback).

Ole Miss 
The Choctaws defeated the Mississippi team 27–7 at a game in Vicksburg.

Millsaps 
Nearby rival Millsaps was beaten 56–0.

Florida

The Choctaws battled coach William G. Kline's Florida Gators to a 7–7 tie. Florida had the greater weight and Mississippi College the greater speed.

Led by Hale, the Choctaws controlled the first half. In the middle of the fourth quarter, Florida  led a comeback with a series of forward passes, scoring its touchdown. Ark Newton had a 92-yard punt in this game.

Spring Hill 
On Thanksgiving Day, Mississippi College beat the Spring Hill Badgers of Mobile 28–7. Hale ran for four touchdowns. Spring Hill's Frank Bogue picked up a fumble and, with no one in front of him and most players down, raced towards the goal. Hale chased him down from behind, saving a touchdown. "It was a sensational run, and probably the fastest ever seen in Mobile."

Baylor 
The final game of the season was a  24–0 loss to Baylor in Dallas.

References

Mississippi College
Mississippi College Choctaws football seasons
Mississippi College Choctaws football